The ThinkPad L-series laptops from Lenovo were designed with the theme of "green". The first laptops in the series were described by Lenovo as being the environmentally friendliest products in the ThinkPad range. Key features that contributed to the eco-friendly tag were the use of recycled material for packaging and post-consumer recycled content (such as office water jugs and used IT equipment).

The predecessor of the ThinkPad L series was the ThinkPad A series, conceived as a desktop replacement. The ThinkPad A series was discontinued in favor of two product lines, the ThinkPad R series and the ThinkPad G series.

The ThinkPad R series introduced Lenovo's new product naming system, as indicated in the published tech specs. The R61 laptop was renamed as R400 and R500. The first digit in the name referred to the display screen size of the product. The R400 laptop had a 14.1" display, while the R500 laptop had a 15.4" display. From the R series onwards, all ThinkPad models transitioned to widescreen displays.

Models

2010
The L-series laptops were launched in 2010 to replace the ThinkPad R series. The first two L-series models – the ThinkPad L412 and the ThinkPad L512 laptops – were predicted to be launched on Earth Day in 2010. The L410 and L510 models ships only in a India market.

L412 and L512
The L412 and L512 laptops met eight military specifications, including parameters for high and low temperature, vibration, altitude and dust. However, the L-series laptops remained relatively lightweight starting at 5.2 lbs (≈2.36 kg). The L-series models were also reputed to be Lenovo's greenest laptops. Lenovo indicated that they were 40% more power efficient than other laptops, and were made from recycled plastic from office water jugs and miscellaneous used equipment.

The L-series laptops were made available with a variety of options, allowing them to be customized to handle business demands, or used as entry-level laptops. The laptops could be equipped with Intel i3 or i5 processors, integrated graphics, or discrete AMD Radeon graphics. Alternatively, the L-series entry-level model included a Celeron P4500 CPU,  GB hard disk, and 1 GB RAM.

The L series was designed to improve on the features of the R-series laptops. L-series laptops were reputed to increase performance over the R series by 150% and improve boot and shutdown times on Windows by 57%. The laptop chassis was also 11% thinner and 12% lighter than the R-series models it was introduced to replace.

Upon release, the ThinkPad L412 was praised by reviewers, with Laptop Magazine calling it a "value-priced business notebook". The review also praised the laptop for green features, performance, and ergonomic design.

The L412 was well received by Laptop Magazine, with the reviewer giving the laptop a score of 4 out of 5 stars. Similarly, NOTEBOOKCHECK gave the ThinkPad L412 laptop a score of 75% (good) from an average of five scores from seven reviews. PCWorld listed the pros of the ThinkPad L412 laptop as being eco-friendly and affordable, while stating that the cons were the loud keyboard and low battery life.

The ThinkPad L512 also received positive reviews, with reviewers comparing it with both the ThinkPad T series and the ThinkPad SL series. NotebookReview.com noted that the L512 was almost identical to comparable SL-series laptops in appearance, with "a consumer take on the rugged, business-oriented T-series ThinkPad". The review also indicated that the chassis flex was less than the Edge 15, but more than the T-series laptops. The L512 was praised for its screen protection with no distortion on the LCD despite heavy pressure applied to the cover, and the easy access to internal components. The green features of the L512 also received notice, with Notebook Review stating that "The L series offers up to 30% post-consumer content, LED-backlit screens and green packaging that takes up 20% less space."

14" (L412)

The L412 has a 14.0-inch display.

15" (L512)
The L512 has a 15.6-inch display.

2011
In February 2011, the ThinkPad L420 and L520 were announced by Lenovo.

L420 and L520
Continuing the naming convention, the L420 has a 14" display, while the L520 has a 15" display.

The 2011 line of L-series laptops included up to second generation Intel i7 processors, Intel HD Graphics or options for AMD Radeon discrete graphics, Lenovo Enhanced Experience 2.0 for Windows 7, and solid-state storage drives. The L420 and L520 laptops offered battery life of up to 11.5 hours and 10.8 hours respectively with the optional 9-cell battery. Lenovo also indicated that the L-series laptops are lighter than similar, competing products.

The L420 and L520 continued the series trend of environmentally friendly features. The L series offered savings on operating costs of 40% annually, as compared to previous generation ThinkPads. The L420 and L520 also featured up to 30% post-consumer recycled content. According to Lenovo, office jugs and used IT equipment had been recycled into different L-series parts including the screen cover, the palm rest, and the top and bottom case. As with most ThinkPad laptops, the L-series models featured certifications from Energy Star and EPEAT Gold.

The Laptop Magazine review of the ThinkPad L420 indicated the pros as being the "great keyboard, affordable price, good battery life, and quick boot time". The battery life marked an improvement over the ThinkPad L412, which was criticized for its low battery life. Laptop Magazine indicated that the cons were weak audio, multitouch gestures, and bland design. Other reviews did not raise similar comments about design. For example, Zimbio only indicated that the L420 comes in a "simple, all-black design". However, the audio was criticized by Zimbio as well, with the reviewer indicating that the sound was slightly muffled.

The L520 was awarded a Business Buy award from Expert Reviews, which indicated in its review that the laptop would appeal to users who preferred "function over form". The review praised the laptop for performance. Points raised about the display were that the backlight was suitably bright and even, and while colors were clear, they were not as vibrant as those found on a glossy screen. This was suggested by the reviewer to be due to the matte finish on the screen, meant to reduce glare from overhead lighting. The keyboard was lauded, with the reviewers praising the large, molded keys that gave 'great feedback'. The only point of contention was the function key, replacing the Control key at the bottom left corner of the keyboard.

14" (L420)
The L420 has a 14.0-inch display.

15" (L520)
The L520 has a 15.6-inch display.

2012

In May 2012, the Thinkpad L430 and L530 were announced by Lenovo.

L430 and L530

The L430 and L530 replaced the L420 and L520. They have the new, island type keyboard.

14" (L430)
The L430 has a 14.0-inch display.

15" (L530)
The L530 has a 15.6-inch display.

2013

L440 and L540
Introduced in October 2013, these feature the new 4th-gen Haswell Intel CPUs, and the new press-to-click 5-point touchpad, integrating the trackpoint's buttons with the top of the touchpad.

14" (L440)
The L440 has a 14.0-inch display.

15" (L540)
The L540 has a 15.6-inch display.

2014

L450 
Features the 4th-gen Haswell Intel CPUs and the 5th-gen Broadwell Intel CPUs.

14" (L450)
The L450 has a 14.0-inch display.

2016

L460 and L560
Introduced in first quarter 2016, these feature the new 6th-gen Skylake Intel CPUs.

14" (L460)
The L460 has a 14.0-inch display.

15" (L560)
The L560 has a 15.6-inch display.

2017

L470 and L570
Introduced in first quarter 2017, these feature the new 7th-gen Kabylake Intel CPUs.

14" (L470)

The L470 has a 14.0-inch display.

15" (L570)
The L570 has a 15.6-inch display.

2018

L380, L380 Yoga, L480, and L580
Introduced in first quarter 2018, these feature Celeron, 7th-gen, or the new 8th-gen Kabylake R (refresh) Intel CPUs.

13" (L380, L380 Yoga)
The L380 and L380 Yoga have a 13.3-inch display. The Yoga is convertible.

14" (L480)
The L480 has a 14.0-inch display.

15" (L580)
The L580 has a 15.6-inch display.

2019

L390, L390 Yoga, L490, and L590
Introduced in first quarter 2019, these feature Celeron or the new 8th-gen Whiskey Lake Intel CPUs.

13" (L390, L390 Yoga)
The L390 and L390 Yoga have a 13.3-inch display. The Yoga is convertible.

14" (L490)
The L490 has a 14.0-inch display.

15" (L590)
The L590 has a 15.6-inch display.

2020

L13, L13 Yoga, L14, and L15
Introduced between the last of quarter 2019 and the beginning of 2020, these feature Celeron, Pentium Gold, the new 10th-gen Intel Core CPUs, or 3rd-gen Ryzen Mobile.

13" (L13, L13 Yoga)
The L13 and L13 Yoga have a 13.3-inch display. The Yoga is convertible.

14" (L14)
The L14 has a 14.0-inch display.

15" (L15)
The L15 has a 15.6-inch display.

References

External links 
 ThinkPad L series at Lenovo.com

Lenovo laptops
L series
Computer-related introductions in 2010